Cyberware Inc. was a company that produced high-performance color 3D scanners. Cyberware was owned and managed by the Addleman family with headquarters in Monterey, California; it has scanning centers located in United States, UK, Europe, Australia and Asia.

3D Color Scanners
A 3D scanner is a device that analyzes a real-world object to collect data on its shape and appearance.

Head & Face
Model PS
Model PX

Whole Body
Model WB2
Model WB4
Model WBX

Custom
Model BK (Below the Knee)
Model LSS (Large Statue Scanner)
Model M15 (Desktop 3D Scanner)
Model S (Shop)
Model SG (Spherical Gantry)
Model 3030 (Scanhead)
Model 7G (Ear Impression)

Selected films
Cyberware won the Academy award for Best Visual Effects in the Hollywood movie The Abyss.
1986: Star Trek IV: The Voyage Home (William Shatner, Leonard Nimoy and the Enterprise crew)
1989: The Abyss (Pseudopod)
1990: RoboCop 2 (computerized talking face)
1991: Terminator 2: Judgment Day (Linda Hamilton, Robert Patrick, Arnold Schwarzenegger and Dan Stanton)
1991: The Doors (film) (Val Kilmer)
1992: Batman Returns (Michael Keaton)
1993: Jurassic Park (film) (dinosaur models)
1994: The Mask (film) (dog model)
1996: Dragonheart (winged dragon model)

Selected video games
2004: Onimusha 3: Demon Siege (Takeshi Kaneshiro and Jean Reno)
2008: Ryū ga Gotoku Kenzan! (Takaya Kuroda, Shota Matsuda, Susumu Terajima, Masaya Kato, Takashi Tsukamoto, Aya Hisakawa and other main characters)
2009: Yakuza 3 (Satoshi Tokushike, Tatsuya Fujiwara, Nakamura Shidō II, Tetsuya Watari, Shigeru Izumiya, George Takahashi and other main characters)
2010: Yakuza 4 (Kōichi Yamadera, Hiroki Narimiya, Rikiya Koyama, Majyu Ozawa, Kenta Kiritani and other main characters)

References

External links

Companies based in Monterey County, California
Film and video technology